Stanley John Matthews (born 20 November 1945) is an English former professional tennis player. He became Wimbledon Boys' Champion in 1962 and reached the second round of the French Open, Wimbledon and the US Open. He is the son of former professional footballer Sir Stanley Matthews.

Football career
Matthews' first foray in sport was via football, and, like his father, he played on the wing. "But I stopped playing soccer, as we call it in America, when I was 12," he explained in 2007. "I was fairly good, but whoever I played, they kicked the shit out of me. I came with a name, and the mentality was, 'We're going to get Stanley Matthews' son.' "

Tennis career
In 1958, Matthews' father arranged for him to attend the Lawn Tennis Association in London. He lived with the family of Charlie Chester, a friend of his father, in North Finchley. In the morning he would work with a private tutor; in the afternoon he would practise at Queen's Club.

Matthews was British Junior Champion between 1960 and 1962, the only three-times winner of the title and last British male winner of the tournament.

In 1962, Matthews won the Wimbledon Boys' Championship. He can remember the final point by point. "It was against Alexander Metreveli, who went on to be the top Russian and lost in the final of a Wimbledon senior." The match went the distance, and Matthews won 7–5 in the final set.

However, despite Matthews' success in the junior ranks, his coach, John Barrett, stated that "ultimately, he just wasn't good enough". Matthews' father said "There is no doubt my reputation did put some pressure on him. I know it worried him a bit, being in my shadow. I hoped he might overcome it." Matthews junior concurs:  "Even though it wasn't football, it was a lot of pressure to live up to the name of Matthews. There would be pictures of my father and me in the papers, and they started to call me the next Fred Perry. Sure, being Dad's son opened some doors, but it also made things harder. Instead of being congratulated if I did well, I was expected to. And if I didn't do well, they'd say 'He's not as good as his father.' Unfortunately, that's how it is. It goes with the territory."

In his short career, Matthews played 23 singles matches, winning six of them. Five of these were in Grand Slam tournaments, when he reached the second round of Wimbledon in 1963 and 1969; the second round of the 1967 and 1969 French Opens, beating Ilie Năstase in the first round of the latter; and the second round of the 1971 US Open. He qualified for the first round of Wimbledon for 11 consecutive years, from 1963 to 1973. He also partook in 17 doubles matches, winning four times.

In 1967, Matthews won the Surrey Hard Court Championships, defeating Keith Wooldridge in the final. He beat his coach, John Barrett, in the semifinals. The following year, he defeated Wooldridge again in the final of the East of England Championships.

In 1971, Matthews represented Britain in the Davis Cup, losing to Yugoslav Boro Jovanović in five sets.

"Obviously, I would have liked to have done better, though I didn't have a bad career. But it was becoming more and more difficult to make a living out of tennis. Looking back, certain aspects were not as good as they should have been. I was a serve and volleyer with a weak serve. If I'd had a serve like Andy Roddick's, I would have done much better. I wasn't quite good enough to be one of the best."

Matches
In May 1962, Matthews made his debut in a Grand Slam event at the French Open. He faced Ernesto Aguirre in the first round, losing in straight sets.

In January 1963, he was knocked out in the first round of the Australian Open by Peter Harris. Matthews won the first set, but Harris came back to win three straight. In June 1963, he made it to the second round of Wimbledon. He defeated Sergio Tacchini in straight sets in the first round, but in round two, he was knocked out in four sets by Rafael Osuna.

In January 1964, in his second and final appearance at the Australian Open, he was again knocked out in the first round. This time, it was at the hands of Barry Phillips-Moore in straight sets. In the summer he returned to Wimbledon, where Torben Ulrich ended his event at the first hurdle. The first set went to a tie-break, which Ulrich won 11–9.

Into 1965, and Matthews made it to the fourth round of the Cannes Carlton tournament. He beat Gardet in round two. In the third round, he defeated Peter Pokorny, then lost to Jaime Pinto-Bravo in the fourth round. At Beaulieu the same year, he was knocked out in straight sets in the first round by Peter Pokorney. At Wimbledon, Matthews was knocked out in straight sets in the first round by Gene Scott.

At 1966's Border Championships, Pat Cramer knocked Matthews out in the first round. At Wimbledon, his first-round match with Ismail El Shafei went to four sets, but the Egyptian won the final set 7–5.

Post-retirement
In 1973 Matthews quit playing tennis and tried his hand in the business world, selling air bubbles to cover tennis courts; however, the growing popularity of squash meant that there were fewer and fewer outdoor courts.

Aged 29, Matthews moved to the United States, and became a coach at Harry Hopman's Port Washington Tennis Academy and also in Norwalk, Connecticut. At the former, he worked with a promising 15-year-old John McEnroe. "I was still fresh off the tour at the time, so could give him a decent game."

In 1976 he became manager at the Four Seasons Racquet Club in Wilton, Connecticut, and has been there ever since. Nine years later, he bought out the original owner. "You can always say, 'Gee whizz, I could have done better' but in terms of how my life turned out, I'm very happy. I'm [at the time of interview] still the last British male to win a singles tournament at Wimbledon, and I'm proud of that. For the past 30 years I have considered myself an entrepreneur, and I've managed that in the States with no name recognition."

In 1981, Matthews briefly picked up his racquet again after eight years to take part in the United States Tennis Association's National Men's 35 Clay Court Championships at the Palm Beach Polo and Country Club in Palm Beach, Florida.

Personal life
Matthews was born to Betty and Stanley Matthews on 20 November 1945. He was the couple's second child after Jean, who was born six years earlier. He is married to Joy, with two stepchildren, Greg and Kristy Moran.

Grand Slam singles performance timeline

Source

References

External links
 
 
 
 Pathé footage of the final of the 1962 junior lawn tennis championship of Great Britain between Stanley Matthews Jnr. & G.R. Stillwell
 "Matthews Back For The Fun Of It In Men's 35 Clay Court Nationals" – The Palm Beach Post, 23 September 1981

1945 births
Living people
English male tennis players
Wimbledon junior champions
Sportspeople from Fairfield County, Connecticut
Tennis people from Connecticut
Sportspeople from Staffordshire
British emigrants to the United States
People from Weston, Connecticut
British male tennis players
Tennis people from Staffordshire
Grand Slam (tennis) champions in boys' doubles
Grand Slam (tennis) champions in boys' singles